Bost Mill Historic District is a national historic district located near Georgeville, Cabarrus County, North Carolina. The district encompasses 10 contributing buildings and 3 contributing sites associated with the Bost Mill grain and cotton operation. Notable buildings include the Bost Roller Mill, the John
Bost House with its five outbuildings, the Bost Tenant House, the St. Paul's Methodist Church, and the Bost Cotton Gin.

It was listed on the National Register of Historic Places in 1986.

References

Historic districts on the National Register of Historic Places in North Carolina
Buildings and structures in Cabarrus County, North Carolina
National Register of Historic Places in Cabarrus County, North Carolina